Down by the Jetty is the debut album by English rock band Dr. Feelgood, released in January 1975.

The band's Johnny Kidd & the Pirates-influenced originals ("Keep It Out of Sight") appear alongside covers material like "Bonie Moronie" and "Tequila".

The album was re-released as a double CD in 2006 (EMI 0946 363951 2 8).

Legacy
Paul Weller and Bob Geldof have acknowledged the influence of Down by the Jetty, as have Blondie, the Ramones and Richard Hell, who were introduced to the album by Blondie's drummer Clem Burke. In 1976, prior to being signed, Paul Weller's band The Jam demoed a cover of "Cheque Book". A copy of the album is also glimpsed on the sleeve of the 1985 album Our Favourite Shop by his later band The Style Council.

In 2006, Uncut magazine listed the album at number 87 on its list of the 100 greatest debut albums.

Track listing
All tracks composed by Wilko Johnson; except where indicated

"She Does It Right" - 3:25
"Boom Boom" (John Lee Hooker) - 2:45
"The More I Give" - 3:27
"Roxette" - 2:58
"One Weekend" - 2:17
"That Ain't the Way to Behave" - 3:58
"I Don't Mind" - 2:37
"Twenty Yards Behind" - 2:13
"Keep It Out of Sight" - 3:02
"All Through the City" - 3:04
"Cheque Book" (Mickey Jupp) - 4:08
"Oyeh!" (Mick Green) - 2:32
"Bony Moronie" / "Tequila" (Larry Williams) / (Danny Flores)  - live recording - 4:50

Re-release
CD 1
The original album remastered, in mono, with five bonus tracks.
All tracks composed by Wilko Johnson; except where indicated.

"She Does It Right"
"Boom Boom" (Hooker)
"The More I Give"
"Roxette"
"One Weekend"
"That Ain't the Way to Behave"
"I Don't Mind"
"Twenty Yards Behind"
"Keep It Out of Sight"
"All Through the City"
"Cheque Book" (Jupp)
"Oyeh!" (Green)
"Bonie Moronie" / "Tequila" (Williams) / (Flores) - (Live)
"(Get Your Kicks On) Route 66" (Bobby Troup)
"I'm a Hog for You Baby" (Jerry Leiber, Mike Stoller)
"Stupidity" (Solomon Burke)
"She Said Alright"
"Oyeh!" - alternative version

CD 2
The original album and bonus tracks as above (excluding "Route 66"), remastered in stereo, using several alternative versions, plus six more bonus tracks.
All tracks composed by Wilko Johnson; except where indicated.

"She Does It Right"
"Boom Boom" (Hooker)
"The More I Give" - alternative version
"Roxette"
"One Weekend"
"That Ain't the Way to Behave"
"I Don't Mind" - alternative version
"Twenty Yards Behind" - alternative version
"Keep It Out of Sight"
"All Through the City"
"Cheque Book" (Jupp)
"Oyeh!" (Green)
"I'm a Hog for You Baby" (Leiber, Stoller)
"Stupidity" (Burke)
"She Said Alright"
"Oyeh!" - alternative version
"Tore Down" (Sonny Thompson) - (Live)
"Don't You Just Know It" (Huey "Piano" Smith, Johnny Vincent) - (Live)
"My Babe" (Willie Dixon) - (Live)
"The More I Give" - (Live)
"It's My Own Fault Darlin'" (B.B. King, Jules Taub) - (Live)
"Bonie Moronie" / "Tequila" (Williams) / (Flores) - (Live)
"Rock Me Baby" (B. B. King, Joe Josea) - (Live)

Personnel
Dr. Feelgood
Lee Brilleaux - lead vocals (1, 3-5, 7, 9-13), guitar, harmonica, slide guitar
Wilko Johnson - guitar, piano, backing and lead (2, 6, 8) vocals
John B. Sparks - bass
John Martin, aka "The Big Figure" - drums
with:
 Bob Andrews - organ (3), saxophone (13)
 Brinsley Schwarz - saxophone (13)
Technical
 Vic Maile - producer
 Dave Charles, Kingsley Ward, Pat Moran - engineers

References

1975 debut albums
Albums produced by Vic Maile
United Artists Records albums
Dr. Feelgood (band) albums